Hft, formerly known as the Home Farm Trust, is a British learning disability charity based in Bristol.  It was established in 1962. The parents who established the charity bought Frocester Manor in Gloucestershire as a residential home for their children. The organisation runs small, person-centred residential care homes and supported living services.

Hft is noted for having established the Fusion Model, which is based on the concept of Person-Centred Active Support, engaging people in meaningful activity and relationships as active participants.

In 2019 it is supporting more than 2,900 adults with learning disabilities. Its charity number is 313069

Locations and services 

It supports a successful group of 44 people in Flintshire, Tri Ffordd, which produces  handcrafted horticultural goods.

In May 2013, it merged with Self Unlimited, another charity set up in the 1960s to provide support for people with learning disabilities.

Supporters and ambassadors 
Anne, Princess Royal has been the Royal patron of the charity since 1982.

Other patrons of the charity have included: 
 Floella Benjamin
 Martin Clunes
 Ronnie Corbett
 Dame Judi Dench
 Sir David Frost
 Sir Stuart Hampton
 Griff Rhys-Jones
 Maureen Lipman
 The Lord Rix
 Dr Oliver Russell
 Dr Phillipa Russell

Memberships and accreditations

Memberships
Hft is a member of the following umbrella organisations:
 British Institute of Learning Disabilities (BILD) 
 Care and Support Alliance (CSA)
 European Association of Service Providers for Persons with Disabilities (EASPD)
 The European Network for Technology Enhanced Learning in an Inclusive Society (ENTELIS)
 Learning Disability Voices
 Telecare Services Association (TSA) 
 Voluntary Organisations Disability Group (VODG)

Accreditations
Hft has achieved several accreditations and certifications:
 Investors in People: Hft has held the Investors in People accolade since 2002, and achieved Silver accreditation in 2017 and 2020. 
 Hft is a Skills For Care Centre of Excellence for its learning and development programme. 
 Hft has achieved compliance with the Energy Saving Opportunity Scheme (ESOS) to show its commitment to reducing energy use and lowering its associated carbon footprint
 Hft is certified as conforming to the requirements of the OHSAS 18001:2007 workplace safety regulation
 Hft has achieved the Cyber Essentials Plus accreditation

Codes of Conduct
Hft is a signatory to a number of different codes of practice and commitments designed to encourage best practice in the social care sector:
 Hft is registered with the Fundraising Regulator and has committed to adhering to the regulator's Code of Fundraising Practise and the Fundraising Promise. 
 Hft has signed up to the Driving Up Quality Code, which  outlines good fundamental practices and behaviour that organisations that support people with learning disabilities need to be committed to.
 Hft is a Disability Confident Employer.

Campaigns and research 

Hft produces an annual Sector Pulse Check report on organisations providing social care that aims to provide a yearly snapshot of the financial health of the sector.

In June 2019 it submitted evidence to the Low Pay Commission  that social care staff are being commissioned at significantly lower rates of pay, compared to local authorities. Social care is typically commissioned at the National Living Wage. The Department of Health and Social Care pays even its lowest paid staff significantly more.

It produced a report with Tunstall Healthcare which was launched in the House of Lords in 2019 highlighting the untapped potential of assistive technology in social care which was welcomed by the Voluntary Organisations Disability Group.

In July 2019 it called for an end to “perverse” commissioning practices that are “negatively impacting” productivity and financial stability in the adult social care sector.  It said that input-based by-hour contracts gave “no incentive” for providers to innovate or deliver anything other than one hour of support.

Books

References

External links 

hft

Charities for disabled people based in the United Kingdom
Charities based in Bristol
Social care in the United Kingdom